GRO J0422+32 is an X-ray nova and black hole candidate that was discovered by the BATSE instrument on the Compton Gamma Ray Observatory satellite on 5 August 1992. 
During outburst, it was observed to be stronger than the Crab Nebula gamma-ray source out to photon energies of about 500 keV.

The mass of the black hole in GRO J0422+32 falls in the range 3.66 to 4.97 solar masses. This is the smallest yet found for any stellar black hole, and near the theoretical upper mass limit (~2.7 ) for a neutron star.

It is also known to have a companion M-type main-sequence star, V518 Per, in the constellation Perseus. It has a magnitude of 13.5 in the B spectral band, and 13.2 in the visible band.

See also
 List of nearest black holes

References

Stellar black holes
Persei, V518
19920805
M-type main-sequence stars
Perseus (constellation)